An unlisted public company is a public company that is not listed on any stock exchange. Though the criteria vary somewhat between jurisdictions, a public company is a company that is registered as such and generally has a minimum share capital and a minimum number of shareholders. Each stock exchange has its own listing requirements which a company (or other entity) wishing to be listed must meet. Besides not qualifying to be listed, a public company may choose not to be listed on a stock exchange for a number of reasons, including because it is too small to qualify for a stock exchange listing, does not seek public investors, or there are too few shareholders for a listing. There is a cost to the listed entities, in the listing process and ongoing costs as well as in compliance costs such as the maintenance of a company register.

In Australia, a public company, whether listed or not, is required to prepare an annual report that includes a directors' report, financial report, and an auditor's report. The report is to be distributed to shareholders 21 days before an annual general meeting or four months after the end of the financial year. These rules are in place because members of the public who have invested in such companies are not always in a position to get information about the companies' performance, and so would not be able to monitor their investment and determine the return on their investment.

References

Other sources
 Risks of investing in an unlisted company, Financial Express, 6 Nov 2005, access date 6 October 2010.

Types of business entity
Stock market